Dendoricellidae is a family of sponges belonging to the order Poecilosclerida.

Genera:
 Dendoricella Lundbeck, 1905
 Fibulia Carter, 1886
 Pyloderma Kirkpatrick, 1907

References

Poecilosclerida
Sponge families